Abdul Razzaq Abdul Jalel al-Issa (Arabic:عبد الرزاق العيسى)  (born 1949) is an Iraqi politician who served in different cabinet posts. He is currently Iraq's Minister of Higher Education.

Early life and education
al-Issa was born in 1949 in Najaf, Iraq. He studied chemistry at the University of Basra in 1971 and received his doctorate from University of Liverpool in 1979. He served as president of the University of Kufa from 2006 until 2011 and in 2015 became a consultant to the Minister of Higher Education "Hussain al-Shahristani". In April 2016, Minister Haider al-Abadi to the government of technocrats to assume the post of Ministry of Higher Education and in August 2016 was approved in the Iraqi parliament to take office.

References

External links
 Official Site (Abdul Razzaq al-Issa)(EN)
  Official site (Ministry of Higher Education and Scientific Research)

1949 births
Living people
Iraqi Shia Muslims
Iraqi chemists
Members of the Council of Representatives of Iraq
Alumni of the University of Liverpool
University of Basrah alumni
Academic staff of the University of Basrah
Finance ministers of Iraq